The Local flood theory or a limited flood theory is an interpretation of the Genesis flood narrative, where the flood of Noah is interpreted as a local event, generally located in Mesopotamia, instead of a global event.

Some old Earth creationists reject flood geology, a position which leaves them open to accusations that they thereby reject the infallibility of scripture (which states that the Genesis flood covered the whole of the earth).  In response, old Earth creationists cite verses in the Bible where the words "whole" and "all" clearly require a contextual interpretation.

Background and history

19th century
The local flood interpretation of Noah's flood became accepted by many Christians after 19th century scientific findings. The view was defended by 19th century Scottish geologist Charles Lyell, in his book Principles of Geology (1833), where he concluded that the Genesis flood must have been a regional affair and not a global deluge.

Creationist view
Old Earth creationist Dr Hugh Ross has defended the local flood theory, and promoted the view in his book "Navigating Genesis". 

Today, Young Earth Creationist organizations such as Answers in Genesis and Institute for Creation Research have criticized a local flood theory, as faulty exegesis.

Evidence of real floods that inspired the Biblical story 
There exists geological evidence that a large local flood did happen in Mesapotamia, additionally extra biblical writings such as Gilgamesh and the Epic of Atrahasis suggest that a local flood happened in ancient Mesapotamia.

References 

Flood narrative
Comparative mythology
Flood myths
Mesopotamian myths
Noach (parashah)